The 1972 World Cup took place 9–12 November at Royal Melbourne Golf Club in Melbourne, Australia. It was the 20th World Cup event. The tournament was a stroke play team event, shortened from 72 holes, after the second round, scheduled on Friday, was cancelled due to bad weather, to 54 holes with 43 teams. Each team consisted of two players from a country. The combined score of each team determined the team results. The Republic of China team of Hsieh Min-Nan and Lu Liang-Huan won by two strokes over the Japan team of Takaaki Kono and Takashi Murakami. The individual competition was won by Hsieh two strokes ahead of Kono. This was the first team victory for the Republic of China, also known as Taiwan, in the history of the World Cup, founded in 1953 and until 1967 named the Canada Cup.

Teams 

(a) denotes amateur

Sources:

Scores 
Team

International Trophy
 

Sources:

References 

World Cup (men's golf)
Golf tournaments in Australia
Sports competitions in Melbourne
World Cup
World Cup golf